The 2004–05 Texas Longhorns men's basketball team represented The University of Texas at Austin in the 2004–05 NCAA Division I men's basketball season as a member of the Big 12 Conference. They were coached by Rick Barnes in his seventh season as head coach and played their home games at the Frank Erwin Center. The Longhorns finished the season with are record of 20–11, 9–7 in Big 12 play in a tie for fifth place. They lost to Colorado in the first round of the Big 12 Tournament. They received an at-large bid to the NCAA Tournament as a No. 8 seed where they lost to Nevada in the first round.

Previous season
The Longhorns finished the 2003–04 season with an overall record of 25–8, 12–4 in Big East play to finish in a tie for second place in conference. They lost to Oklahoma State in the finals of the Big 12 Tournament. They received an at-large bid as a No. 3 seed to the NCAA Tournament. In the Tournament, they defeated Princeton and North Carolina to advance to the Sweet Sixteen. there they lost to Xavier.

Roster

Schedule and results

|-
!colspan=9 style=| Exhibition

|-
!colspan=9 style=| Non-conference regular season

|-
!colspan=9 style=|Big 12 regular season

|-
!colspan=9 style=|Big 12 tournament

|-
!colspan=9 style=|NCAA tournament

References

Texas
Texas Long
Texas Long
Texas Longhorns men's basketball seasons
Texas